520 Park Avenue is a skyscraper on East 60th Street near Park Avenue on the Upper East Side of Manhattan, New York City. It was designed by Robert A.M. Stern Architects and completed in 2018. The building was funded through a US$450 million construction loan from The Children's Investment Fund. At 781 feet tall, it is the 36th tallest building in New York City and the tallest on the Upper East Side.

Arthur and William Lie Zeckendorf of Zeckendorf Development developed the building.

Architecture
Like much of Stern's work, the building is New Classical in style. The exterior of the building is clad in limestone, similar to Stern's other New York City skyscrapers including 15 Central Park West, 30 Park Place and 220 Central Park South. The developer, Arthur Zeckendorf has described the building as the East Side sister of 15 Central Park West.

The building has 35 apartments on its 64 stories including a $130 million triplex penthouse. Prices begin at over $20 million for a  apartment, and residences close to the top have balconies.

Amenities

The building includes an outside garden, private movie theater, children's playroom, swimming pool, wine cellars and a bi-level fitness center.

History

The developers had been planning a building since 2006, but were delayed by difficulties vacating the previous commercial building on the site. Plans for the building were first announced in December 2012, with the selection of Robert A.M. Stern Architects. Shortly after, the developers purchased  of air rights from the neighboring Christ Church United Methodist and Grolier Club for over $40 million. The building's design was officially unveiled in March 2014 and was completed in 2018.

Notable residents
Residents who have purchased units include:

 Orlando Bravo, private equity investment manager
 Frank Fertitta III, the former owner of UFC
 James Dyson, the founder of Dyson
 Ken Moelis, an investment banker
 Bob Diamond, former CEO of Barclays
 Ronn Torossian, a public relations executive

References

External links  

 

Residential skyscrapers in Manhattan
Robert A. M. Stern buildings
Upper East Side
Residential buildings completed in 2018
Condominiums and housing cooperatives in Manhattan
Park Avenue
New Classical architecture
Pencil towers in New York City